Cytharopsis butonensis is a species of sea snail, a marine gastropod mollusk in the family Mangeliidae.

Taxonomy
Shuto (1970) referred the Indonesian Mangilia butonensis Schepman, 1913 which may indeed be an aberrant Leiocithara Hedley, 1922, although its narrow shape could indicate that M.M. Schepman was closer in ascribing it to the genus Mangelia. Kuroda & Oyama (1971) transferred Mangilia butonensis to Cytharopsis

Description
The length of the shell varies between 12 mm and 20 mm.

(Original description) The shell has an elongately fusiform shape, with a high spire and moderately long siphonal canal. It is smooth, shining, pellucid and white. It contains 8 whorl, of which 3½ seem to form a convexly whorled protoconch. Of these the upper 2 are smooth, the rest with crowded axial ribs. The post-nuclear whorls show more remote ribs, 7 or 8 on penultimate whorl, each rib with a small point near its middle, giving an angular appearance to these whorls, though the interstices are nearly regularly rounded. The upper part of the whorls are very faintly crenulate. The base of the body whorl shows very faint spiral striae, more conspicuous on the ribs and a few stronger ones on the sipgonal canal. The aperture is oblong, narrow, slightly angular above, below with a rather wide siphonal canal. The peristome is sharp, with a shallow sinus above and a strong rib at some distance behind its margin. The columellar margin is slightly concave above, directed to the left below, with a thin layer of enamel. The interior of the aperture is smooth.

Distribution
This marine species occurs off Sulawesi, Indonesia; in the East China Sea, Taiwan, the Andaman Sea, off Thailand and the Philippines.

References

 Liu J.Y. [Ruiyu] (ed.). (2008). Checklist of marine biota of China seas. China Science Press. 1267 pp.

External links
  Tucker, J.K. 2004 Catalog of recent and fossil turrids (Mollusca: Gastropoda). Zootaxa 682: 1–1295.
 
 MNHN, Paris: Cytharopsis butonensis

butonensis
Gastropods described in 1913
Molluscs of the Pacific Ocean